Magnum Photos is an international photographic cooperative owned by its photographer-members, with offices in New York City, Paris, London and Tokyo. It was founded in 1947 in Paris by photographers Robert Capa, David "Chim" Seymour, Maria Eisner, Henri Cartier-Bresson, George Rodger, William Vandivert, and Rita Vandivert. Its photographers retain all copyrights to their own work.

In 2010, MSD Capital acquired a collection of nearly 200,000 original press prints of images taken by Magnum photographers, which in 2013 it donated to the Harry Ransom Center.

Founding of agency
Magnum was founded in Paris in 1947 by Robert Capa, David "Chim" Seymour, Henri Cartier-Bresson, George Rodger and William Vandivert (all photographers), Rita Vandivert and Maria Eisner, based on an idea of Capa's. (Seymour, Cartier-Bresson and Rodger were all absent from the meeting at which it was founded. In response to a letter telling him that he was a member, Rodger wrote that Magnum seemed a good idea but, "It all sounded too halcyon to be true," when Capa had told him of it and, "I rather dismissed the whole thing from my mind".)

Rita Vandivert was the first President, and head of the New York office; Maria Eisner the head of the Paris office. The plan was for Rodger to cover Africa and the Middle East; Cartier-Bresson to cover south and east Asia; Seymour and William Vandivert to cover Europe and the United States, respectively; and Capa to be free to follow his curiosity and events.

Magnum is one of the first photographic cooperatives, owned and administered entirely by members. The staff serve a support role for the photographers, who retain all copyrights to their own work.

The Magnum cooperative has included photojournalists from across the world, who have covered many historical events of the 20th century. The cooperative's archive includes photographs depicting family life, drugs, religion, war, poverty, famine, crime, government and celebrities.

Although it has been asserted that the name "Magnum" was chosen because the founding members always drank a bottle of champagne during the first meetings, Russell Miller writes:

Governance 
Magnum is owned by its photographers, who act as shareholders. Each full member of Magnum has a vote in proposals made at a meeting held once a year, called the Annual General Meeting (AGM). Photographers with the status of contributor or correspondent are represented by Magnum but have no voting rights. Full members can choose to become contributors after 23 years of membership; this status gives them increased liberty to work outside Magnum, at the cost of their voting rights.

Elections of new members

In the early years of Magnum, membership had generally come about by the personal invitation of Robert Capa. However, in 1955 a three-stage membership system was set up that continues to this day and is described below. Until 1953 there were also a large number of stringers who used Magnum but were not members.

Magnum's photographers meet once a year, during the last weekend in June, in New York City, Paris or London, to discuss the cooperative's business. One day of the meeting is reserved to review potential new members' portfolios and vote on admitting individuals. An approved applicant is invited to become a 'Nominee Member' of Magnum, a category of membership that provides a chance for members and the individual to get to know each other, but that includes no binding commitments on either side.

After two years of Nominee membership, a photographer may present another portfolio if wanting to apply for 'Associate Membership'. If successful, the photographer is bound by the rules of the agency, and enjoys its facilities and worldwide representation. The difference between an Associate Member and a full Member is that an Associate is not a Director of the Company and does not have voting rights in the corporate decision-making. After two more years, an Associate wanting to be considered for full membership presents another portfolio of work for consideration by the members. Once elected as a full member, the individual is a member of Magnum for life or for as long as the photographer chooses.

No member photographer of Magnum has ever been asked to leave.

Accusations of child protection issues with Magnum's digital archive
Magnum Photos' digital archive constitutes more than 1 million images, that Magnum licenses through its website. In August 2020, the Magnum website was taken offline after issues were raised by theFstoppers photography website and amplified on social media by others including Jörg Colberg.  Given the tags on the photos, there was concern that Magnum was making available photographs of children featuring nudity; that documented encounters that constituted a record of acts of child sexual abuse; and that were problematic in terms of the way they had been labelled for searching. "Much of the criticism [. . .] has focused on a series of photographs by the US photographer David Alan Harvey from his time documenting sex workers in Bangkok in 1989." In a statement Magnum said it will re-examine the content of its archive, and has since made its website available again but without Harvey's Bangkok series. Harvey was later suspended for a year following a formal investigation into sexual misconduct allegations against him.

Photographic collection
In February 2010, Magnum announced that Michael Dell's venture capital firm MSD Capital had acquired a collection of nearly 200,000 original press prints of images taken by Magnum photographers. It had formed a partnership with the Harry Ransom Center at The University of Texas at Austin to preserve, catalog, and make photographs available to the general public. In September 2013 it was announced MSD Capital donated the collection to the Ransom Center. A preliminary inventory is available for researchers who wish to use the collection.

Graduate Photographers Award
The Graduate Photographers Award was established in 2015.

Member list

Publications
America in Crisis. New York, NY: Ridge Press; Holt, Rinehart and Winston, 1969. . Text by Mitchel Levitas, edited by Charles Harbutt and Lee Jones, photographs by Eve Arnold, Cornell Capa, Bruce Davidson, Elliott Erwitt, Burt Glinn, Philip Jones Griffiths, Charles Harbutt, Danny Lyon, Constantine Manos, Donald McCullin, Dennis Stock, Mary Ellen Mark and possibly others.
In Our Time: The World as Seen by Magnum Photographers. New York; London: W W Norton & Co Inc, 1989. . By William Manchester. With essays by Manchester ("Images: a Wide Angle"), Jean Lacouture ("The Founders") and Fred Ritchin ("What is Magnum?"), and "Biographical Notes and Selected Bibliographies" and "Bibliography and Chronology of Magnum" by Stuart Alexander.
Magnum Landscape. London: Phaidon, 1996. With a foreword by Ian Jeffrey and texts by Henri Peretz, "The Phenomenon of Landscape" and "Chronology of Landscape Photography".
Hardback, 1996.
Paperback, 2005. .
magnum°. London: Phaidon, 2002. . Text by Michael Ignatieff, design by Julia Hasting.
Magnum Stories by Chris Boot. London: Phaidon, 2004. .
Our World in Focus. London: Trolley Books, 2004. .
Magnum Magnum. London: Thames & Hudson, 2007. Edited by Brigitte Lardinois.
Compact flexibound edition. London: Thames & Hudson, 2009, 2010. .
Pop Sixties by Magnum Photos. New York, NY: Abrams, 2008. .
Reading Magnum: A Visual Archive of the Modern World, edited by Steven Hoelscher. Austin, TX: University of Texas Press, 2013. .
Magnum Analog Recovery. Paris: Le Bal, 2017. Edited by Diane Dufour, Pierre Haurquet and Anna Planas. English and French editions.
 Magnum Manifesto. London: Thames and Hudson, 2017. . English, French and Italian editions.
 Euro Visions. Paris: Steidl/Magnum in Partnership with the Centre Pompidou, 2006. . English.
 Georgian Spring: A Magnum Journal. London: Chris Boot in Partnership with the Georgian Ministry of Culture, 2009. . English and Georgian editions.
 Magnum Cycling. London: Thames & Hudson, 2016. With text by Guy Andrews. . English.
 Paris: Magnum. Flammarion, 2014. . English and French editions.
 Women Changing India. University of Chicago Press, in Partnership with BNP Paribas, 2013. . English.
Magnum Chronicles 01: a Brief Visual History in the Time of ISIS. Magnum, 2018. Newspaper format. Text in English and Arabic.
Magnum Streetwise: the ultimate collection of street photography from Magnum Photos. London; New York: Thames & Hudson, 2019. Edited by Stephen McLaren. Photographs from various Magnum photographers. .

See also
David Kogan – CEO from 2015 to 2019
Magnum Foundation

References

Further reading
Magnum: Fifty Years at the Front Line of History: The Story of the Legendary Photo Agency. New York, NY: Grove Press, 1999. By Russell Miller. .
 Magnum Generation(s). Caurette Editions, 2023. By Jean-David Morvan, Rafael Ortiz, Scie Tronc, and Arnaud Locquet. Translated by Barth Hulley.

External links

Arts organizations established in 1947
French companies established in 1947
Artist cooperatives
Photojournalism organizations
Photo agencies